The LaGuardia Committee was the first in-depth study into the effects of smoking cannabis in the United States. An earlier study, the Indian Hemp Drugs Commission, was conducted by the colonial authorities in British India in 1893–94. The reports systematically contradicted claims made by the U.S. Treasury Department that smoking marijuana results in insanity, deteriorates physical and mental health, assists in criminal behavior and juvenile delinquency, is physically addictive, and is a "gateway" drug to more dangerous drugs.

The report was prepared by the New York Academy of Medicine, on behalf of a commission appointed in 1939 by New York Mayor Fiorello LaGuardia who was a strong opponent of the 1937 Marijuana Tax Act. Released in 1944, the report infuriated Harry Anslinger, who was campaigning against marijuana. Anslinger condemned it as unscientific.

Anslinger went on an offensive against what he saw as a "degenerate Hollywood" that was promoting marijuana use. After high-profile arrests of actors like Robert Mitchum, Hollywood gave Anslinger full control over the script of any film that mentioned marijuana.

Sociological conclusions
After more than five years of research the members of the committee drew up a catalog of 13 salient points with the conclusions they reached.

 Marihuana is used extensively in the Borough of Manhattan but the problem is not as acute as it is reported to be in other sections of the United States.
 The introduction of marihuana into this area is recent as compared to other localities.
 The cost of marihuana is low and therefore within the purchasing power of most persons.
 The distribution and use of marihuana is centered in Harlem.
 The majority of marihuana smokers are Blacks and Latin-Americans.
 The consensus among marihuana smokers is that the use of the drug creates a definite feeling of adequacy.
 The practice of smoking marihuana does not lead to addiction in the medical sense of the word.
 The sale and distribution of marihuana is not under the control of any single organized group.
 The use of marihuana does not lead to morphine or heroin or cocaine addiction and no effort is made to create a market for these narcotics by stimulating the practice of marihuana smoking.
 Marihuana is not the determining factor in the commission of major crimes.
 Marihuana smoking is not widespread among school children.
 Juvenile delinquency is not associated with the practice of smoking marihuana.
 The publicity concerning the catastrophic effects of marihuana smoking in New York City is unfounded.

Therefore, according to the LaGuardia Report, the gateway drug theory is without foundation (points 7 and 9).

Consequences
Published in 1944, the report offended Harry Anslinger, who branded it as "unscientific". Harry Anslinger denounced Mayor Fiorello LaGuardia, the New York Academy of Medicine and the doctors who had worked for more than five years on the research. Anslinger said that they should not conduct more experiments or studies on marijuana without his personal permission. Anslinger interrupted, between 1944 and 1945, each current research on derivatives of cannabis, and according to some personally commissioned the American Medical Association to prepare a position which would reflect the one of the government. 

The study conducted by AMA between 1944 and 1945 on Anslinger's personal request, having as objective to disprove the statements of the LaGuardia Report, leveraged again on racism, asserting that "of the experimental group, thirty-four men were black, and only one was white", and "those who smoked marijuana, became disrespectful of white soldiers and officers during military segregation".

Only in 1972, the same institutional source that spread the series of scientifically unfounded rumors about the dangers of cannabis admitted that "these stories were largely false" and that "with careful consideration of the documentation there is no confirmation of the existence of a causal relationship between marijuana use and the possible use of heroin". Thus, it was declared that the ban on cannabis was imposed and still subsisted "without any serious and comprehensive research had been conducted on the effects of marijuana".

See also

Boggs Act
Narcotic Control Act
War on Drugs
Shafer Commission

References

External links
LaGuardia Committee's report

History of law enforcement in the United States
Cannabis research
Drug control law in the United States
Cannabis in New York (state)
Marihuana Tax Act of 1937
1944 in cannabis